George H. Harrison (April 9, 1841 – January 18, 1919) was an American sailor who received the Medal of Honor for valor in action during the American Civil War.

Biography
Harrison was born on April 9, 1841, in Middleton, Massachusetts, and joined the Navy in March 1862. He was awarded his Medal of Honor for gallantry under fire while crewing the ship's 11 inch pivot gun. He was discharged from the Navy in November 1864, but re-enlisted a few months later, serving until 1867. 

Harrison died on January 18, 1919, and was buried in Forestdale Cemetery in Malden, Massachusetts.

Medal of Honor citation
Rank and organization: Seaman, U.S. Navy. Born: 1842, Massachusetts. Accredited to: Massachusetts. G.O. No. 45, December 31, 1864.

Citation:

Served on board the U.S.S. Kearsarge when she destroyed the Alabama off Cherbourg, France, 19 June 1864. Acting as sponger and loader of the 11-inch pivot gun during the bitter engagement, Harrison exhibited marked coolness and good conduct and was highly recommended for his gallantry under fire by the divisional officer.

See also
List of American Civil War Medal of Honor recipients: G–L

Battle of Cherbourg

Notes

References

External links

1841 births
1919 deaths
Union Navy sailors
United States Navy Medal of Honor recipients
People of Massachusetts in the American Civil War
Burials in Massachusetts
American Civil War recipients of the Medal of Honor